Tito Raymond (born in Chicago, Illinois, on August 10, 1969) is a National Physique Committee ("NPC") bodybuilder and athlete.

Tito made his NPC debut in 1993 by competing in Musclemania and where he came 5th.  His first 1st place win came in the 1997 Musclemania competition.  Tito continued on to win three more first place winnings in the NPC Team Universe Championships for three years in a row, from 1999 to 2001. He currently resides in Los Angeles, California.

Tito has eight siblings and is the older brother of IFBB Pro bodybuilder Jose Raymond.
He is married and has a child with Amy Fadhli.

Stats
Height: 5'8
Off Season Weight:
Competition Weight: 180 lbs.

Competition history
Year Competition Placing

1993 Musclemania Middleweight, 5th
1993 NPC USA Championships Middleweight, 13th
1994 Musclemania Light Heavyweight, 4th
1994 NPC Team Universe Championships Middleweight, 10th
1995 NPC Team Universe Championships Middleweight, 6th
1996 NPC Team Universe Championships Middleweight, 3rd
1997 Musclemania Middleweight, 1st
1997 NPC Team Universe Championships Middleweight, 2nd
1998 NPC Team Universe Championships Middleweight, 3rd
1998 NPC USA Championships Middleweight, 9th
1999 Musclemania Professional, 1st
1999 NPC Team Universe Championships Middleweight, 1st
1999 NPC USA Championships Middleweight, 4th
1999 NPC World Amateur Championships Middleweight, 3rd
2000 NPC Team Universe Championships Middleweight, 1st
2000 NPC USA Championships Middleweight, 3rd
2000 IFBB World Amateur Championships Middleweight, 4th
2001 NPC Team Universe Championships Middleweight, 1st
2001 NPC USA Championships Middleweight, 2nd
2001 IFBB World Games Middleweight, 3rd
2002 NPC USA Championships Middleweight, 5th
2003 NPC California Championships Light Heavyweight, 2nd

References

American bodybuilders
Sportspeople from Chicago
1969 births
Living people
Competitors at the 2001 World Games
World Games bronze medalists